A sprint train is a group of road bicycle racers who at the end of a race work together to set a high pace to keep their sprinter at the front of the race, discourage late attacks, and allow the sprinter to launch his or her sprint as late as possible with the least amount of fighting for position.

See also
Climbing train

Road bicycle racing terminology